The Old Bridge, also named the State Bridge, the Main Bridge, and the Drava Bridge, is a bridge crossing the Drava River in Maribor, northeastern Slovenia.

The bridge was completed in 1913 and opened to traffic on 23 August of that year. During World War II, it was damaged and later partially rebuilt. The last renovations took place in 1990 and 1998.

Gallery

References

External links 
 

Bridges in Maribor
Bridges completed in 1913
Bridges over the Drava
Arch bridges in Slovenia
Road bridges in Slovenia
20th-century architecture in Slovenia